The handball tournaments at the 2020 Summer Olympics took place from 24 July to 8 August 2021 at Yoyogi National Gymnasium in Tokyo.

It was originally scheduled to be held in 2020, but on 24 March 2020, the Olympics were postponed to 2021 due to the COVID-19 pandemic. The pandemic meant that there were no spectators. The format was the same as it has been since 2000 for the men and 2008 for the women: 12 teams in two groups playing round robin followed by knock-out matches for the eight best starting with quarter-finals and ending with final and bronze match. 

France took both gold medals as the first team since Yugoslavia in Los Angeles 1984. Both finals were a repetition of the last ones: Denmark versus France for the men and Russia/ROC versus France for the women. In 2016 France lost both matches. 

Norway got their second bronze in a row for the woman and Spain got the bronze for the men defeating Egypt, who got their best result ever and became best non-European team for the men. South Korea became best non-European team for the women. The host Japan became last for the women and second last for the men surpassing Argentina.

Most valuable players were Anna Vyakhireva (ROC) for the women and Mathias Gidsel (DEN) for the men. Mikkel Hansen (DEN) broke two records for men at the olympics: most goal in a tournament (61) and most goals in olympic handball (154).

Schedule

Events
Two sets of medals will be awarded in the following events:

 Men's handball (12 teams)
 Women's handball (12 teams)

Qualification
The National Olympic Committees might enter only one 14-player men's team and only one 14-player women's team.

Men's qualification

Women's qualification

Medal summary

Medal table

Medalists

Men's tournament

Group stage
The teams were divided into two groups of six nations, playing every team in their group once. Two points were awarded for a victory, one for a draw. The top four teams per group qualified for the quarter-finals.

Group A

Group B

Knockout stage

Final standings

Women's tournament

Group stage
The teams were divided into two groups of six nations, playing every team in their group once. Two points were awarded for a victory, one for a draw. The top four teams per group qualified for the quarter-finals.

Group A

Group B

Knockout stage

Final standings

References

External links
 Results book 

 
2020
2020 Summer Olympics events
Olympics
International handball competitions hosted by Japan